Katrin Kivi (born on 18 July 1967 in Kärdla) is an Estonian diplomat.

In 1990 she graduated from University of Tartu with a degree German language and literature.

Since 1993 she is working for Estonian Foreign Ministry. She was Ambassador of Estonia to Denmark.

She is serving as Ambassador of Estonia to India.

References

Living people
1967 births
Estonian women diplomats
Ambassadors of Estonia to Denmark
University of Tartu alumni
People from Kärdla